Colin Begg may refer to:
 Colin Begg (politician)
 Colin Begg (statistician)